Operation Deliverance was a Canadian military operation in Somalia that formed part of the United Nations peace-making deployment to that country during the early part of the Somali Civil War. The mission began on December the 3rd, 1992 and involved about 1,400 Canadian troops, a helicopter unit and the supply ship HMCS Preserver.

While Canada's mission objectives were largely completed, including the freeing of a captured Canadian journalist and the defeat of the Somali warlord Mohamed 'Tiger' I. Barre, Operation Deliverance turned into a political disaster for the Canadian Forces after several Somali civilians were brutally killed or injured in what became known as the Somalia Affair. The Somalia Affair was largely responsible for the disbandment of the Canadian Airborne Regiment in 1995 and additionally resulted in numerous dismissals and resignations along the chain of command up to, but not including, the Minister of Defence

Canada lost one soldier during the mission, Corporal Michael David Abel of the Canadian Airborne Regiment.  He was killed when a rifle being cleaned by a fellow soldier discharged accidentally, shooting him.

See also 

Canadian Airborne Regiment
Somali Civil War
Somalia Affair

References 

http://www.forces.gc.ca/site/newsroom/view_news_e.asp?id=974
http://archives.cbc.ca/war_conflict/peacekeeping/topics/723/

Conflicts in 1992
Military history of Canada
United Nations operations in Somalia